The Jungle Woman is a 1926 Australian film directed by Frank Hurley. It was shot partly on location in Thursday Island back to back with another Hurley feature, The Hound of the Deep (1926).

Plot
Englishman Martin South (Eric Bransby Williams) is leading an expedition into the Dutch New Guinea hinterland to search for gold, being joined by George Mardyke (Jameson Thomas), who he thinks is his friend. The expedition is attacked by headhunters and Mardyke leaves Martin for dead so he can pursue the latter's fiancée, Eleanor (Lillian Douglas), the daughter of a plantation manager.

Meanwhile, Martin is nursed back to health by native girl, Hurana (Grace Savieri), who falls in love with him and helps him escape from some angry natives. Hurana is bitten by a snake and dies, and Martin arrives back to civilisation in time to rescue Eleanor from Mardyke.

Cast
Eric Bransby Williams as Martin South
Grace Savieri as Hurana
Jameson Thomas as George Mardyke
Lillian Douglas as Eleanor
W.G. Saunders as Peter Mack

Production
After the disappointing reception to his documentaries in America, Hurley decided to go into dramatic feature films. He succeed in persuading the Australian-born British theatre magnate Sir Oswald Stoll to provide £10,000 and several actors and technicians to make two films in Papua and Thursday Island.

Hurley made The Hound of the Deep on Thursday Island then intended to shoot Jungle Woman in Papua. However the Australian government refused him permission to film there. This forced Hurley to instead make the movie at Merauke in Dutch New Guinea.

Release
The film was not released before The Hound of the Deep although it was made beforehand. It was a popular success at the box office in Australia and Britain and proved profitable.

References

External links
Jungle Woman in the Internet Movie Database
Jungle Woman at National Film and Sound Archive
Documentary shot during the making of the film at Australian Screen Online

1926 films
Australian silent feature films
Australian black-and-white films